SA Water is a government business enterprise wholly owned by the Government of South Australia.

History
SA Water was established by the proclamation of the South Australian Water Corporation Act 1994 on 1 July 1995. Prior to this its predecessor was known as Engineering and Water Supply Department (E&WS). E&WS evolved from the Waterworks and Drainage Commission, which was established in 1856, 20 years after European settlement.

Key infrastructure projects SA Water has undertaken include:

Morgan – Whyalla pipeline (1940–1944)
Mannum – Adelaide pipeline (1949–1955) 
Hope Valley Reservoir (commenced work 1869)
Mount Bold Reservoir (commenced work 1932)
Bolivar Waste Water Treatment Plant (commenced work 1961)
Swan Reach-Paskeville pipeline (extended from Swan Reach-Stockwell pipeline), 1960s
Adelaide Desalination Plant (2008–2012)
 North South Interconnection  System Project (NSISP) (2010–2013)

Assets and infrastructure
SA Water manages, maintains and operates (with the assistance of its partners) assets worth $13 billion. These include:

More than 26,000 km of water mains
More than 8,700 km of sewer mains
More than 180 km of recycled water mains
30 water treatment plants
24 wastewater treatment plants
More than 16 reservoirs with a total capacity of almost 200,000 megalitres
Terminal Storage Mini Hydro, a 3MW electricity generator powered by water flowing from Anstey Hill to Hope Valley.

SA Water also owns desalination plants at Lonsdale and Penneshaw.

Location and staff
SA Water employs more than 1,500 people and has its head office in Victoria Square in Adelaide (SA Water House). Staff are also located across South Australia including offices in Mount Gambier, Berri, Mount Barker, Port Lincoln and Crystal Brook as well as Victoria and New South Wales. SA Water's customer service centre operates out of the head office in Victoria Square. SA Water House is also the headquarters of the Australian Water Quality Centre (AWQC).

Customers and community
SA Water provides water and wastewater services to a population of approximately 1.5 million people across South Australia. In 2011/12 the total volume of water delivered was 208,144 ML and the average residential consumption per household was 164.3 kL.

SA Water runs a school education program called SA Water Brainwave that is offered free to South Australian schools.
SA Water also offers free community tours of wastewater and water treatment plants.
In 2013, SA Water opened the Kauwi Interpretive Centre at the Adelaide Desalination Plant which is also open for visitors.

See also
Adelaide
Lake Victoria (New South Wales)
City of Burnside

References

External links
SA Water homepage

Organisations based in Adelaide
Water companies of Australia
Companies established in 1995
Government agencies of South Australia
Government-owned companies of South Australia